Chen Cuifen (1873–1960) was a longtime romantic partner of Sun Yat-sen, the founder and first president of the Republic of China. She was regarded as the "forgotten revolutionary female" and "the first revolution partner" of Sun Yat-sen. Before marrying Soong Ching-ling, Sun Yat-sen had a 20 year-relationship with Chen Cuifen. In the "Sun Genealogy", she was called "Sun Yat-sen's concubine".

Biography 
Chen was born in Hong Kong in 1873, the fourth child of her family.

Chen and Sun met in 1892, then fell in love. She made many contributions to the revolution. She lived with Sun in Japan. She acted as Sun's wife to the outside world, and helped the secret activities of the revolution.

She lived in Penang from 1910 until 1912. 

After the establishment of the Republic, she settled in Malaya alone.

In the movie Road To Dawn (2007), which features the story of Sun Yat-sen in Penang, the character of Chen Cuifen is played by Chinese actress Wu Yue.

References 

1873 births
1960 deaths
Hong Kong people
Chinese revolutionaries
20th-century Chinese women
20th-century Chinese people